= Christian cult =

Christian cult may refer to:

- Cult (religious practice)
- Christian new religious movement
